Mormidea is a genus of stink bugs in the family Pentatomidae. There are about five described species in Mormidea.

Species
These five species belong to the genus Mormidea:
 Mormidea cubrosa Dallas, 1851
 Mormidea lugens (Fabricius, 1775)
 Mormidea pama Rolston, 1978
 Mormidea pictiventris Stål, 1862
 Mormidea ypsilon (Fabricius, 1775)

References

Further reading

External links

 

Pentatomidae genera
Pentatomini